Kalliani is a village in northwestern Arcadia, Peloponnese, Greece. It is part of the municipal unit of Tropaia.

Population

717 (1961)
613 (1971)
532 (1981)
546 (1991)
401 (2001)
291 (2011)

External links
http://www.kalliani.tk

Populated places in Arcadia, Peloponnese